Akçalan is a village the central district (Karaman) of Karaman Province, Turkey. At  it is situated in the Taurus Mountains. The population is of Akçaalan is 322. as of 2011. Major economic activities of the village are agriculture and animal breeding.

References

Villages in Karaman Central District